2010–11 Eurocup Basketball was the ninth edition of Europe's second-tier level transnational competition for men's professional basketball clubs, the EuroCup. The EuroCup is the European-wide league level that is one tier below the EuroLeague level. It began with qualifying round matches on September 29, 2010, and ended on April 16-17, 2011, with the 2010–11 Eurocup Finals, which was played at the Arena Palaverde, in Treviso.

Teams

Qualifying round 

|}

Regular season 
The Regular Season ran from November 16, 2010 to December 21, 2010.

If teams were level on record at the end of the Regular Season, tiebreakers were applied in the following order:
 Head-to-head record.
 Head-to-head point differential.
 Point differential during the Regular Season.
 Points scored during the regular season.
 Sum of quotients of points scored and points allowed in each Regular Season match.

Top 16

Quarterfinals 

The quarterfinals were two-legged ties determined on aggregate score. The first legs was played on March 23. All return legs were played on March 30. The group winner in each tie, listed as "Team #1", hosted the second leg.

|}

Final four 

Euroleague Basketball Company announced that the 2010-11 Eurocup season would culminate with the Eurocup Finals in Treviso, Italy, on April 16 and 17.

Semifinals 
April 16, Palaverde, Treviso

|}

3rd place game 
April 17, Palaverde, Treviso

|}

Final 
April 17, Palaverde, Treviso

|}

Final standings

Individual statistics

Points

Rebounds

Assists

Awards

MVP Weekly

Regular season

Top 16

Quarterfinals

Eurocup MVP 
  Dontaye Draper (Cedevita)

Eurocup Finals MVP 
  Marko Popović (UNICS)

All-Eurocup Team

Coach of the Year 
  Aleksandar Petrović (Cedevita)

Rising Star 
  Donatas Motiejūnas (Benetton Bwin Treviso)

References

External links 
 EuroCup Official Website
 European Basketball Website

 
2010–11 in European basketball leagues
2010-11